Kolonica is a village and municipality in the Snina District of the Prešov Region of north-eastern Slovakia. It has a population of about 600 people.

History
In historical records the village was first mentioned in 1567.

Observatory
Just east of the village is a Soviet-manufactured one-metre telescope, the biggest telescope in Slovakia, used for observing variable stars.

Geography
Kolonica is around 80 km east of Košice, lies at a height of 360 metres and covers an area of 27.181 km².

References

External links
 
 
Spectacular Slovakia travelguide - Kolonica: heavenly pleasures

Villages and municipalities in Snina District
Zemplín (region)